Monodontus is a genus of parasitic nematodes in the subfamily Bunostominae of family Ancylostomatidae. Most of its species occur in rodents and suids, but Monodontus louisianensis is from the white-tailed deer (Odocoileus virginianus) and Monodontus giraffae from the giraffe (Giraffa camelopardalis). An unspecified Monodontus has been recorded from the marsh rice rat (Oryzomys palustris) in Florida.

See also 
 List of parasites of the marsh rice rat

References 

Ancylostomatidae
Rhabditida genera
Parasitic nematodes of mammals
Parasites of rodents